Jean Basson (born 5 October 1987) is an Olympic swimmer from South Africa.  At the 2008 Olympic Games, Basson placed fourth in the 200-metre freestyle final with a time of 1:45.97.  He also competed in the 400 m freestyle and the 4 x 200 m relay.  At the 2012 Summer Olympics, he took part in the 4 x 200 m relay.  Basson lives and trains in Tucson, Arizona, under coach Frank Busch.  He attended the University of Arizona, where he was a member of the Arizona Wildcats swimming and diving team.

References

External links
Arizona Wildcats athlete: Jean Basson

1987 births
Living people
Swimmers from Johannesburg
South African male freestyle swimmers
Olympic swimmers of South Africa
Swimmers at the 2008 Summer Olympics
Swimmers at the 2012 Summer Olympics
Arizona Wildcats men's swimmers
Swimmers at the 2010 Commonwealth Games
Commonwealth Games silver medallists for South Africa
Commonwealth Games bronze medallists for South Africa
Commonwealth Games medallists in swimming
African Games bronze medalists for South Africa
African Games medalists in swimming
Competitors at the 2011 All-Africa Games
Medallists at the 2010 Commonwealth Games